Tang Talkh-e Shomilan (also Romanized as Tang Talkh-e Shomīlān; also known as Tang-e Talkh) is a village in Abolfares Rural District, in the Central District of Ramhormoz County, Khuzestan Province, Iran. At the 2006 census, its population was 76, in 14 families.

References 

Populated places in Ramhormoz County